Paul Steven Mannweiler (born July 20, 1949) is an American politician and attorney who served as a member of the Indiana House of Representatives serving from 1979 to 2001.

Education 
He received his undergraduate degree from Indiana University Bloomington and Juris Doctor degree from Indiana University, Indianapolis.

Career 
He served as Speaker of the Indiana House of Representatives from 1986 to 1990 and again from 1994 to 1996. He previously served as a political aide to Indiana Governor Otis Bowen.

References

External links
Project Vote Smart – Representative Paul Mannweiler (IN) profile
Profile at  Bose McKinney & Evans

|-

|-

|-

|-

1949 births
Living people
Republican Party members of the Indiana House of Representatives
21st-century American politicians